Dedan Kimathi Waciuri (31 October 1920 – 18 February 1957), born Kimathi wa Waciuri in what was then British Kenya, was the senior military and spiritual leader of the Mau Mau Uprising. Widely regarded as a revolutionary leader, he led the armed military struggle against the British colonial regime in Kenya in the 1950s until his capture in 1956 and execution in 1957. Kimathi is credited with leading efforts to create formal military structures within the Mau Mau, and convening a war council in 1953. He, along with Musa Mwariama, General China and Muthoni Kirima, was one of the Field Marshals.

Kenyan nationalists view him as the heroic figurehead of the Kenyan freedom struggle against British colonial rule, while the British government saw him as a terrorist. Despite being viewed with disdain by the first two presidents of independent Kenya, Jomo Kenyatta and Daniel arap Moi, Kimathi and his fellow Mau Mau rebels were officially recognised as heroes in the struggle for Kenyan independence under the Mwai Kibaki administration, culminating in the unveiling of a Kimathi statue in 2007. This was reinforced by the passage of a new Constitution in 2010 calling for recognition of national heroes.

Early life
Kimathi was born in Thegenge Village, Tetu division, in today'sNyeri County. His father died in September 1920, a month before Kimathi was born. Kimathi was raised by his mother, Waibuthi, one of his father's three wives. He had two brothers, Wambararia and Wagura, and two sisters. At the age of fifteen, he enrolled at the local primary school, Karuna-ini, where he perfected his English. He continued his education in the secondary school Tumutumu CMS School. He was a passionate writer, and wrote extensively before and during the Mau Mau uprising. He was a Debate Club member in his school and also showed ability in poetry. Kimathi balked at any efforts to discipline or control him, and was constantly in trouble with his teachers; as a result, he drifted in and out of the educational system. Tumutumu could not contain his rebellious nature. It is alleged he even tried to paralyze learning at the institution by stealing the school bell. His associates said he took the bell and rang it loudly while atop the Tumutumu hill. The missionaries were however lenient, his name still remains in the preserved school register. In 1940, Kimathi enlisted in the British Army, but was discharged after a month, allegedly for drunkenness and persistent violence against his fellow recruits. He moved from job to job, from swineherd to primary school teacher, from which he was dismissed after accusations of violence against his pupils. His close associates however said he was dismissed for ranting about the school administration.

Mau Mau movement

Around 1947 or 1948, whilst working in Ol Kalou, Kimathi came into contact with members of the Kenya African Union (KAU). By 1950 he had become secretary to the KAU branch at Ol Kalou, which was controlled by militant supporters of the Mau Mau cause. The Mau Mau began as the Land and Freedom Army (KLFA), a militant Kikuyu, Embu and Meru army which sought to reclaim land, which the British settlers had gradually stripped away from them. As the group's influence and membership widened it became a major threat to the colonial government.

Upon taking the oath of the Mau Mau, Kimathi in 1951 joined the Forty Group, the militant wing of the defunct Kikuyu Central Association. As branch secretary, Kimathi presided over oath-taking. He believed in compelling fellow Kikuyu by way of oath to bring solidarity to the independence movement. To achieve this he administered beatings and carried a double-barrelled shotgun. His activities with the group made him a target of the colonial government, and he was briefly arrested that same year but escaped with the help of local police. This marked the beginning of his involvement in the uprising, and he formed the Kenya Defence Council to co-ordinate all forest fighters in 1953.

Capture and execution 
Kimathi's fight for an independent Kenya came to an end in 1956. On 21 October of that year, Ian Henderson, a British colonial police officer who had been on an "obsessive hunt" for Kimathi, managed to trap him in his hide-out in the forest. Kimathi was shot in the leg and captured by a Tribal Policeman called Ndirangu Mau

who found Kimathi armed with a panga (a bladed African tool like a machete). His capture marked the beginning of the end of the forest war; the image of Kimathi being carried away on a stretcher was printed in leaflets by the British (over 120,000 were distributed), to demoralise the Mau Mau and their supporters. Kimathi was charged with possession of a .38 Webley Scott revolver.

A court presided over by Chief Justice O'Connor and with an all-black jury of Kenyans sentenced him to death while he lay in a hospital bed at the General Hospital Nyeri. His appeal was dismissed, and the death sentence upheld.

The day before his execution, he wrote a letter to a Father Marino asking him to get his son an education: "He is far from many of your schools, but I trust that something must be done to see that he starts earlier under your care." He also wrote about his wife, Mukami, saying "She is detained at Kamiti Prison and I suggest that she will be released some time. I would like her to be comforted by sisters e.g. Sister Modester, etc. for she too feels lonely. And if by any possibility she can be near the mission as near Mathari so that she may be so close to the sisters and to the church."

He asked to see his wife, and the morning of the execution Mukami was allowed to see Kimathi. The two chatted for close to two hours. He told her that "I have no doubt in my mind that the British are determined to execute me. I have committed no crime. My only crime is that I am a Kenyan revolutionary who led a liberation army... Now If I must leave you and my family I have nothing to regret about. My blood will water the tree of Independence."

In the early morning of 18 February 1957 he was executed by hanging at the Kamiti Maximum Security Prison. He was buried in an unmarked grave, and his burial site remained unknown for 62 years until 25 October 2019 when the Dedan Kimathi Foundation reported that the grave-site had been identified at the Kamiti Prison grounds.

Personal life
Kimathi was married to Mukami Kimathi. Among their children are sons Wachiuri and Maina and daughters Nyambura, Waceke,Wangeci,Nyakinyua Nyawira, Muthoni, Wangui and Wanjugu. The government constructed a three-bedroomed house for Mukami at her farm in Kinangop, Nyandarua County in 2009 and provided her with a double cabin pickup for private use in 2012. In 2010, Kimathi's widow requested that the search for her husband's body be renewed so she could give him a proper burial.

Legacy

Official registration of the Mau Mau
On 11 November 2003, the Kibaki government formally registered the Mau Mau movement, disregarding the colonial-era legislation that had outlawed the organisation and branded its members "terrorists". In his remarks during the handing over of the certificate, Vice President Moody Awori regretted that it had taken 40 years for the group to be officially registered despite the sacrifices the Mau Mau had made for Kenya's independence.

The Dedan Kimathi statue

The Kibaki government erected a 2.1 metre bronze statue titled Freedom Fighter Dedan Kimathi on a graphite plinth, in central Nairobi. The statue is at the junction of Kimathi Street and Mama Ngina Street. Kimathi, clad in military regalia, holds a rifle in the right hand and a dagger in the left, the last weapons he held in his struggle. The foundation stone for the statue was laid by Vice President Awori on 11 December 2006 and the completed statue unveiled by President Kibaki on 18 February 2007 coinciding with the 50th anniversary of the day he was executed. In his remarks, Kibaki paid homage to Kimathi as a man who not only paid the ultimate price for Kenya's liberation but also inspired others to fight against oppression.

The statue attracted praise from Kenyans as a long overdue recognition of the Mau Mau for their part in the struggle for independence. This was in marked contrast to the post-colonial norm of the Jomo Kenyatta and Daniel Arap Moi governments' regard of the Mau Mau as terrorists.

On 12 September 2015, the British government unveiled a Mau Mau memorial statue in Nairobi's Uhuru Park that it funded "as a symbol of reconciliation between the British government, the Mau Mau, and all those who suffered". This followed a June 2013 decision by Britain to compensate more than 5,000 Kenyans tortured and abused during the Mau Mau insurgency.

Nelson Mandela
Kimathi was held in high regard by anti-apartheid leader Nelson Mandela. In July 1990, five months after his release from 27 years of imprisonment by South Africa's apartheid regime, Mandela visited Nairobi and requested to see Kimathi's grave and meet his widow Mukami. Mandela's request was an embarrassing moment for the Moi administration, which had largely ignored Kimathi, like Jomo Kenyatta's government before it. It was an awkward moment searching for her in the village where she and her family lived forgotten in poverty. Mandela's request was not met. During a public address at the Kasarani Stadium in Nairobi before he left the country, Mandela stated his admiration for Kimathi, Musa Mwariama, Waruhiu Itote and other Mau Mau leaders who inspired his own struggle against injustice. It was only 15 years later in 2005, during his second visit to Kenya, that Mandela finally managed to meet Mukami as well as two of Kimathi's children.

Mandela's respect for Kimathi by the early 1960s is also alluded to in My Moment with a Legend by Ronnie Kasrils, the former intelligence chief of the ANC's armed wing Umkhonto We Sizwe (MK) and defence minister in Mandela's government.

Places named after Kimathi
 Dedan Kimathi University of Technology
 Dedan Kimathi Stadium, Nyeri, Kenya (formerly known as Kamukunji Grounds)
 Kimathi Street, Nairobi, Kenya – One of the main roads in Nairobi's Central Business District and where there is a statue in his honor
 Dedan Kimathi Road, Lusaka, Zambia - Situated on this road is the Intercity Bus Terminus and ZCAS University.
 Kimathi Avenue, Kampala, Uganda
 Dedan Kimathi Road, Mombasa, Kenya
 Kimathi Road, Nyeri Town, Kenya
 Kimathi Road, Nanyuki Town, Kenya
 Dedan Kimathi Street, Embalenhle, Mpumalanga, South Africa
 Dedan Kimathi Memorial High School, Nyeri, Kenya
 Kimathi Crescent, Isamilo, Mwanza, Tanzania

Popular culture and further reading
 The Trial of Dedan Kimathi (play) – Micere Mugo and Ngũgĩ wa Thiong'o
 Karimi, Joseph (2013). Dedan Kimathi: The Whole Story. Jomo Kenyatta Foundation.
 Mukami Kimathi (2017). Mau Mau Freedom Fighter. Mdahalo Bridging Divides Limited.
 
 Kahiga, Samuel (1990). Dedan Kimathi: The Real Story. 
 Maina wa Kinyatti. Kenya's Freedom Struggle: The Dedan Kimathi Papers. 
 Jabali Afrika (2011). Dedan Kimathi (song)

References

External links 
 Daily Nation: Villagers' fond memories of Mau Mau hero Kimathi
 Kenya Times: Did Kimathi die in vain? 
 Dedan Kimathi's background (article in the middle of the page)
 A brief discussion of the uprising
 Report from Kenya

1920 births
1957 deaths
20th-century executions by the United Kingdom
British colonial army soldiers
Executed Kenyan people
Executed revolutionaries
Kenyan rebels
Kikuyu people
People executed by British Kenya by hanging
People from Nyeri County
People of the Mau Mau Uprising